

John Cheney (1801-1885) was an engraver in Boston, Massachusetts, and Philadelphia in the 19th century. He travelled in Europe in the 1830s. His brothers were Ward Cheney and Seth Wells Cheney, who married the writer, Ednah Dow Littlehale Cheney. Examples of Cheney's work are in the Museum of Fine Arts, Boston. In 1833, he was elected into the National Academy of Design as an Honorary Academician.

References

Further reading
 Sylvester Rosa Koehler. Catalogue of the engraved and lithographed work of John Cheney and Seth Wells Cheney. Boston: Lee and Shepard, 1891

External links

 WorldCat. Cheney, John 1801-1885
 Library of Congress. Everett cigarros puros superiores, 1856. Engraved by Cheney
 New York Public Library. Edward Everett. Engraved by Cheney after R.M Staigg
 New York Public Library. Fitz-Greene Halleck. Engraved by Cheney
 New York Public Library. W.E. Channing.  Engraved by Cheney
 Smithsonian Works by Cheney

1801 births
1885 deaths
Artists from Connecticut
19th century in Boston
American engravers
19th-century American printmakers
19th-century American male artists